Bruno Stagno Ugarte (born 1970) was the Minister of Foreign Affairs of Costa Rica from 2006 to 2010 and was the president of the Assembly of States Parties of the International Criminal Court (ICC) from 2005 to 2008.

Early life and education
Born in Paris, Stagno has academic degrees from Princeton University, Georgetown University, and the University of Paris.

Career
Stagno served as Costa Rica's permanent ambassador to the United Nations from 2002 to 2006, where he was among other tasks designated Vice-President of the negotiations leading to the 2005 United Nations Summit Outcome Document. In 2005, he succeeded Jordan's Zeid Ra'ad Zeid Al-Hussein and became the second president of the Assembly of States Parties of the ICC. Stagno's term at the ICC expired in 2008, and he was succeeded by Christian Wenaweser of Liechtenstein.

Stagno became the Minister of Foreign Affairs of Costa Rica on 8 May 2006 and served for a full four-year term under President and Nobel Peace Prize laureate Oscar Arias Sanchez. He established diplomatic relations with 21 countries and led Costa Rica's participation as a Non-Permanent Member of the Security Council in 2008-2009 as well as negotiations for free trade agreements, and related agreements, with China (2008) and the European Union (2010).

Other activities
Stagno is an Affiliate Professor at the Paris School of International Affairs (PSIA), as well as a Member of its Strategic Committee and Scientific Committee. He is an Officier de la Legion d'Honneur (France).

Stagno is Deputy Executive Director at Human Rights Watch, responsible for Global Advocacy, and sits on numerous boards and advisory groups, including the Carter Center, Crisis Action, Global Center for the Responsibility to Protect, among others.

References

Coalition for the International Criminal Court, "Costa Rican Ambassador Elected as Next President of the International Criminal Court Assembly of States Parties", media advisory, 2004-09-10

External links
Chiefs of State and Cabinet Members of Government: Costa Rica, exxun.com, accessed 2008-04-16

1970 births
Living people
Academic staff of Sciences Po
Walsh School of Foreign Service alumni
Princeton University alumni
University of Paris alumni
Costa Rican diplomats
Costa Rican people of Italian descent
Presidents of the Assembly of States Parties of the International Criminal Court
Permanent Representatives of Costa Rica to the United Nations
Foreign ministers of Costa Rica